The 2020 UCI Cyclo-cross World Championships were held from 1 to 2 February 2020 in Dübendorf, Switzerland.

Schedule
All times are local (UTC+1).

Medal summary

Medalists

Medals table

References

External links
 

UCI Cyclo-cross World Championships
World Championships
2020 in Swiss sport
International cycle races hosted by Switzerland
Dübendorf
UCI Track Cycling World Championships

no:VM i banesykling 2020